Rasmus Jensen is a Danish motorcycle speedway rider. He is currently riding for Holsted Tigers in the Danish Speedway League and Gdańsk in the Polish Ekstraliga.

Career 
Rasmus Jensen's career began in the year 2001. His first season in British racing was with Plymouth in 2013; at the end of the season, his official average was 7. At the end of the following 2014 Premier League season, his average was 6.14, and he was in fourth place among the Plymouth Devils riders' averages. Jensen completed 2016 with a 6.14 average and completed 2018 with a 6.59 average.

He spent 2019 with the Second Division club Glasgow Tigers, and as of the 33rd issue of averages that season, he had an official average of 8.34, making his average the second highest on the team, behind British rider Craig Cook. In 2019, the Glasgow Tigers came first in the Championship Pairs, using the riders Rasmus Jensen and Craig Cook. Jensen scored a total of three race wins on the night. The September 28th issue of the Speedway Star stated, "Cami [Brown] also heaped praise on Cookie's race partner Jensen and can be well satisfied that he insisted on chasing his signature during the build-up to the new season last winter.

During 2019, the Premiership club Swindon replaced Dawid Lampart with Rasmus Jensen due to "an impressive guest performance." The 25th issue of official Premiership averages gave Jensen an average of 7.7, third highest on the team. Speedway Star's August 31, 2019 edition rated Rasmus Jensen Premiership "Rider of the Week" and stated, "at this stage the introduction of Jensen must stand as the biggest and best move of 2019."

Rasmus Jensen has been signed by Swindon Robins for 2020. In a Speedway Star article titled "Sad Time for Jensen," it was reported that Rasmus Jensen would not be a part of the Glasgow Tigers speedway team in 2020 because he wanted "to go for Grand Prix glory."

Jensen finished in 17th place following just one appearance during the 2022 Speedway World Championship, he securing 12 points during the Danish Grand Prix as part of the 2022 Speedway Grand Prix. However, his biggest success of the season and his career to date came in June 2022, when he won the 2022 Danish Individual Speedway Championship.

Major results

World individual Championship
2022 Speedway Grand Prix - 17th

References 

1993 births
Living people
Danish speedway riders
Glasgow Tigers riders
Plymouth Devils riders
Somerset Rebels riders
Swindon Robins riders
Workington Comets riders